Bogdanka may refer to the following places:
Bogdanka, a stream flowing through the Jeżyce district of Poznań
Bogdanka, Łódź Voivodeship (central Poland)
Bogdanka, Lublin Voivodeship (east Poland)
Bogdanka, West Pomeranian Voivodeship (north-west Poland)